Archibald Seton Montgomerie, 16th Earl of Eglinton and 4th Earl of Winton (23 June 1880 – 22 April 1945), was the son of George Arnulph Montgomerie, 15th Earl of Eglinton, and Janet Lucretia Montgomerie. It was the 16th Earl who abandoned Eglinton Castle, the family seat or 'caput', in 1925.

He was educated at Eton College, served in World War I with the Life Guards and sat in the House of Lords as the 4th Earl of Winton.

On 1 June 1908, he married Lady Beatrice Susan Dalrymple, a daughter of the 11th Earl of Stair. They were divorced in 1922 after having five children:

Lady Barbara Susan Montgomerie (23 August 1909 – 1992), grandmother of Georgina, Duchess of Norfolk
Lady Janet Egida Montgomerie (3 May 1911 – died 30 December 1999); married Robert Crichton Stuart, son of The Marquess of Bute
Lady Betty Mary Seton Montgomerie (8 May 1912 – 15 October 1996)
Archibald William Alexander Montgomerie, 17th Earl of Eglinton (1914–1966)
Hon. George Seton Montgomerie (1919–1934)

On 16 August 1922, he married Marjorie McIntyre and they had two children:
Lady Anne Montgomerie
Hon. Roger Hugh Montgomerie (1 July 1923 – 7 August 2011)

References

External links

1880 births
1945 deaths
People educated at Eton College
16
British Army personnel of World War I
British Life Guards officers
Deputy Lieutenants of Ayrshire
Clan Montgomery